Auspicius (died 130?) is said to be the successor of St. Maternus as the Bishop of Trier, Germany. However, some authorities identify him as the 5th-century Bishop of Toul, France.

References

130 deaths
Gallo-Roman saints
Saints of Germania
2nd-century Christian saints
2nd-century bishops in Gaul
Roman Catholic bishops of Trier
Year of birth unknown